was the President of Panasonic. He also serves as a member of the board of Teijin

Early life 
Fumio Ōtsubo was born in 1945 in Osaka, Japan, where he attended the Kansai University.

Career 
Fumio Ōtsubo began his career with Panasonic in 1971.　On June 3, 2006, Panasonic announced that Ōtsubo had been made a president of its corporate executive group.

References 

 
1945 births
Japanese chairpersons of corporations
Japanese chief executives
Living people
People from Osaka Prefecture
Academic staff of Kansai University
Kansai University alumni